John McDaniel (born September 23, 1951) is a former American football wide receiver in the National Football League for the Cincinnati Bengals and the Washington Redskins.  He played college football at Lincoln University of Missouri and was drafted in the eighth round of the 1974 NFL Draft.

1951 births
Living people
Players of American football from Birmingham, Alabama
American football wide receivers
Lincoln Blue Tigers football players
Cincinnati Bengals players
Washington Redskins players